The National Newark Building (Formerly the National Newark and Essex Bank Building) is a neo-classical office skyscraper in Newark, New Jersey. It has been the tallest building in Newark since 1931 and was tallest in New Jersey until 1989. It is located in the heart of Downtown Newark at 744 Broad Street, just north of Four Corners.

The building was designed by the father and son architectural firm, John H. & Wilson C. Ely, which also designed Newark City Hall and the American Insurance Company Building. The exterior is chiefly tan brick and limestone. The top of the building is inspired by the Mausoleum at Halicarnassus, one of the Seven Wonders of the World. The ten mezzanine murals by J. Monroe Hewlett and Charles Gulbrandsen depict the growth of commerce in Newark.

It underwent a $68 million renovation which was completed in 2002.

See also
 List of tallest buildings in Newark
 List of tallest buildings in New Jersey

References

External links
 Graph of New Jersey's ten tallest buildings
 Old Newark.com office building images
 Newark skyscraper photos
 BCDC Newark buildings and sites

Art Deco architecture in New Jersey
Historic district contributing properties in Newark, New Jersey
Office buildings completed in 1931
Skyscraper office buildings in Newark, New Jersey